Focal spot blooming is the unwanted change in the focal spot size of an X-ray tube during change in exposure.

Cause 
Focal spot blooming is caused due to increased mAs. When high exposure setting are used, the electron beam from the cathode fail to focus on an particular point because of electrostatic repulsion.

References

Radiology
X-ray instrumentation